The Pomilio Gamma was an Italian fighter prototype of 1918.

Design and development

Gamma
The Pomilio company of Turin designed and manufactured the Gamma, a wooden, single-seat, single-bay biplane with wings of unequal span, the upper wing being of greater span than the lower. It was powered by a 149-kilowatt (200-horsepower) SPA 6A water-cooled engine driving a two-bladed tractor propeller. It had fixed, tailskid landing gear.

The Gamma prototype first flew early in 1918. An Italian official commission observed a demonstration of it, and concluded that although it was fast and had good maneuverability, its rate of climb was insufficient to merit a production order.

Gamma IF
Pomilio responded to the Gammas shortcomings by building a second prototype, the Gamma IF, fitted with a more powerful Isotta Fraschini V.6 engine rated at 186 kilowatts (250 horsepower). An official commission saw a demonstration of the Gamma IF in 1918, but at first could not agree on whether it merited a production order. During the final weeks of World War I, the commission finally decided to order a small number of Gamma IF fighters, although the Gamma IF never entered active service.

Variants
Gamma
First prototype with SPA 6A engine
Gamma IF
Second prototype with Isotta Fraschini engine

Operators

Corpo Aeronautico Militare

Specifications (Gamma IF)

Notes:
Time to 3,000 m (9,842 ft): 7 min 30 sec

Notes

References

Green, William, and Gordon Swanborough. The Complete Book of Fighters: An Illustrated Encyclopedia of Every Fighter Aircraft Built and Flown. New York: SMITHMARK Publishers, 1994. .

Gamma
1910s Italian fighter aircraft
Military aircraft of World War I
Single-engined tractor aircraft
Biplanes
Aircraft first flown in 1918